Obren Cvijanović (born 30 August 1994) is a Bosnian professional footballer who plays as a forward for Bosnian Premier League club Borac Banja Luka and the Bosnia and Herzegovina national team.

Club career
Cvijanović made his professional debut for Krupa in the Bosnian Premier League on 24 July 2016, starting in a home game against Mladost Doboj Kakanj before being substituted out in the 57th minute. The game finished as a 1–1 draw.

International career
Cvijanović made his international debut for Bosnia and Herzegovina on 27 March 2021 in a friendly game against Costa Rica, which finished as a 0–0 draw.

Career statistics

International

References

External links

Obren Cvijanović at footbl.com

1994 births
Living people
People from Kotor Varoš
Bosnia and Herzegovina footballers
Bosnia and Herzegovina international footballers
Association football forwards
FK Krupa players
NK Zvijezda Gradačac players
FK Velež Mostar players
Premier League of Bosnia and Herzegovina players
First League of the Republika Srpska players
First League of the Federation of Bosnia and Herzegovina players
Serbs of Bosnia and Herzegovina